Hamid may refer to:
 Hamid, Abadan, Khuzestan Province
 Hamid, Shushtar, Khuzestan Province
 Hamid, North Khorasan
 Hamid, West Azerbaijan
 Hamid, Mahabad, West Azerbaijan Province